Dorree Cooper is an American set decorator. She was nominated for an Academy Award in the category Best Art Direction for the film Legends of the Fall.

Selected filmography
 Legends of the Fall (1994)

References

External links

Year of birth missing (living people)
Living people
American set decorators
Artists from New Orleans